Stanislav Gross' Cabinet was  formed by coalition of the Czech Social Democratic Party (ČSSD), the Christian and Democratic Union - Czechoslovak People's Party (KDU-ČSL) and the Freedom Union - Democratic Union (US-DEU). Stanislav Gross had to resign due to a scandal related to unclear origins of the loan to buy his flat. Gross' cabinet was replaced by Jiří Paroubek's cabinet

Government ministers 

Czech government cabinets
Czech Social Democratic Party
KDU-ČSL
Freedom Union – Democratic Union
Coalition governments of the Czech Republic